
Gmina Krasnopol, is a rural gmina (administrative district) in Sejny County, Podlaskie Voivodeship, in north-eastern Poland.

Villages
Gmina Krasnopol contains the villages and settlements of Aleksandrowo, Buda Ruska, Czarna Buchta, Czerwony Krzyż, Głuszyn, Gremzdel, Gremzdy Polskie, Jegliniec, Jeglówek, Jeziorki, Krasne, Krasnopol, Królówek, Krucieniszki, Linówek, Łopuchowo, Maćkowa Ruda, Michnowce, Mikołajewo, Murowany Most, Nowa Żubrówka, Nowe Boksze, Orlinek, Pawłówka, Piotrowa Dąbrowa, Rudawka, Ryżówka, Skustele, Smolany Dąb, Stabieńszczyzna, Stara Żubrówka, Teklinowo, Wysoka Góra, Żłobin and Żubronajcie.

Neighbouring gminas
Gmina Krasnopol is bordered by the gminas of Giby, Nowinka, Puńsk, Sejny, Suwałki and Szypliszki.

References
Polish official population figures 2006

Krasnopol
Sejny County